WIQO-FM (100.9 MHz) is a commercial radio station licensed to Forest, Virginia, and serving the Lynchburg metropolitan area.  It simulcasts a talk radio format with sister station 106.3 WMNA-FM Gretna, Virginia.  They are owned and operated by Three Daughters Media.  

WIQO-FM has an effective radiated power (ERP) of 200 watts.  The transmitter is on North Business Mountain Road in Forest, Virginia.

Programming
Weekday mornings on WIQO-FM and WMNA-FM begin with a local wake up show hosted by Janet Rose, also shared with co-owned WGMN.  The rest of the weekday schedule is nationally syndicated talk programs:  The Hugh Hewitt Show, The Tom Sullivan Show, The Lars Larson Show, CBS Eye on the World with John Batchelor, Red Eye Radio,  This Morning, America's First News with  Gordon Deal and The Markley, Van Camp and Robbins Show.  

Weekends feature shows on money, home repair, cars, guns and real estate.  Syndicated hosts include Ben Ferguson, Rick Valdes, John Catsimatidis and Our American Stories with Lee Habeeb.  Most hours begin with an update from CBS Radio News.

History
It originally had the call sign WKEY-FM and was located in Covington, Virginia. It was the sister station of WKEY 1340 AM and was owned by WKEY, Inc.  In the early and mid-1970s, the station played easy listening music and was an affiliate of the ABC FM Network.

In 1977, the station was moved to the more lucrative Lynchburg radio market.  It took the call letters WIQO-FM.

References

External links
 100.9 WIQO Online
 

1964 establishments in Virginia
News and talk radio stations in the United States
Radio stations established in 1964
IQO-FM